Cauchas breviantennella is a moth of the Adelidae family. It is found in Sweden, Finland and northern Russia.

The wingspan is 9–10 mm. Adults are on wing in July.

References

Moths described in 1980
Adelidae
Moths of Europe